Kürdəxanı (also, Kurdakhany) is a settlement and municipality in Sabunchu district of Baku, Azerbaijan.

History 
Earliest settlements in Kurdakhany are believed to be dated at least two millennia ago, which is supported by archeological artifacts. Historical monuments:
 Sheykh Ali Shirvani khanqah and mosque - built in 1448
 Haji Zeynal hamam - built in 17th century
 Haji Jafargulu hamam - built in 16th century
 Juma mosque - 14th century (rebuilt in 2007)
Kurdakhany was one of settlements which were not affected by March Day events. Due to armed resistance with local qochu.

Quarters 
Kurdakhany is located on northern side of Absheron peninsula, highest altitude above sea level, rich with salt lakes and mud volcanos. Municipality is divided into three quarters: Old quarter, New quarter and gardens.

Old quarter 
Old quarter is oldest part of Kurdakhany. A local school, kindergarten, Juma mosque is located on this quarter.

New quarter 
New quarter is located on western side of municipality and mostly consists of post-Soviet houses on former sovkhoz lands. Inhabitants are mostly refugees from Karabakh as well as non-local population which came from nearby municipalities.

Gardens 
Locals have additional lands seaside, which are called "Ləhiş bağları" (Lahij gardens). A mosque exists in gardens quarter which was built by local inhabitants in the 19th century, besides a khanqah of an Ahi Brotherhood which was built in 1448.

Famous people 
 Vasim Mammadaliyev -  Azerbaijani scientist of oriental studies
 Huseynbala Aghaverdiyev (1890-1937) - Minister of the State Property and Cultivation of Azerbaijan SSR, also a street named after him.
 Abbasgulu Kazimzadeh - Founding member of Musavat party, member of Azerbaijan Democratic Republic parliament
 Baba Punhan - Famous Azerbaijani poet

Martyrs
Several martyrs of the first Karabakh war were born in Kurdakhany - Ilgar Guliyev (has a street named after him), Pasha Nazirov, Faiz Heydarov, Ilgar Zulfugarov (a street named after him), Natig Babayev, Fikrat Babayev, Mubariz Mammadov.

Miscellaneous 
Kurdakhany has a relatively modern "Yamin Castle", named after his builder Yamin who built this "castle" by his own hands during his madness.

References 

Municipalities of Baku